The Polish or Poland is a European breed of crested chickens known for its remarkable crest of feathers. The oldest accounts of these birds come from  The Netherlands; their exact origins are unknown, however. In addition to combs, they are adorned with large crests that nearly cover the entirety of the head. This crest limits their vision, and as a result can affect their temperament. Thus, though normally tame, they may be timid and easily frightened.

Polish chickens are bred primarily as an ornamental bird, and in the case of show-quality birds, for show, but were originally productive egg layers. Accordingly, Polish rarely go broody and are noted for their white eggs. There are bearded, non-bearded and frizzle varieties.

Etymology

The origins of the breed's name are uncertain. The breed could have been named after the country of Poland. Its name could have also come from the Middle Dutch word pol 'head' (compare origin of poll tax), in reference to the Polish's dome-shaped skull.

History
Though the derivation of the Polish breed is unclear, one theory suggests that their ancestors were brought by Asian Mongols to Central and Eastern Europe during medieval times, and thus, could have originated in Poland. The Polish was standardized in the Netherlands and declared a thoroughbred in the 16th century. Chickens bearing a strong resemblance to the Polish can be seen in paintings from the 15th century, and the breed was extensively portrayed in Dutch and Italian paintings from the 16th through the 18th centuries. Though usually only a fair layer at best today, In France they were once known as an excellent producer of eggs. The American Poultry Association states that the breed was introduced to America between 1830 and 1840. The breed was, during a certain period of time, favored by American farmers and chicken fanciers. The American Poultry Association accepted three Polish varieties into the American Poultry Association's Standard of Perfection in 1874; additional varieties were accepted in 1883, 1938 and 1963.

Characteristics
The Polish has a small V-shaped comb, though it is often hidden by the large crest of feathers. The earlobes and wattles are small and may also be completely hidden by the crest. Some varieties possess "beards" and thus may also hide the appearance of the wattles. The earlobes are white, the comb and wattles bright red.

References

Chicken breeds originating in the Netherlands
Chicken breeds